The following is a list of prominent people who were born in the U.S. state of South Carolina, lived in South Carolina, or for whom South Carolina is a significant part of their identity. It is divided into two major sections, living and deceased.

Living

A–B

 John Abraham (born 1978), born in Timmonsville, NFL defensive end for the Arizona Cardinals
 Rick Adair (born 1958), born in Spartanburg, pitching coach for the Baltimore Orioles
 Kimberly Aiken (born 1975), born in Columbia, Miss America 1994
 Jaimie Alexander (born 1984), born in Greenville, actress, Kyle XY, Blindspot, the Thor movies
 Ray Allen (born 1975), lived in Dalzell, Hillcrest H.S., NBA star for the Miami Heat
 Bill Anderson (born 1937), born in Columbia; country music singer and songwriter, nicknamed "Whisperin' Bill"
 Ike Anderson (born 1957), born in Columbia, Greco-Roman wrestler who competed at 1988 Summer Olympics
 Olanda Anderson (born 1972), born in Sumter, former boxer, member of the 2000 United States Olympics team
 Aziz Ansari (born 1983), born in Columbia, actor and comedian
 Robert Ayers (born 1985), raised in Clio, defensive end for the New York Giants
 Alex Barron (born 1982), born in Orangeburg, left tackle for the Dallas Cowboys
 Tyler Bass (born 1997), from Columbia, kicker for the Buffalo Bills
 Samuel Beam (born 1974), born in Columbia, singer-songwriter under the stage name Iron & Wine
 Shelton Benjamin (born 1976), born and raised in Orangeburg, professional wrestler and former amateur wrestler
 Charles Dantonja Bennett (born 1983), born in Camden, football player for Clemson University and Tampa Bay Buccaneers
 Ben Bernanke (born 1953), graduated from high school in Dillon in 1971, former Chairman of the Federal Reserve
 The Big Show (born Paul Donald Wight), professional wrestler and actor, born in Aiken
 Blue Sky (born 1938), born in Columbia and lived there for the majority of his life, painter and sculptor
 Charles F. Bolden Jr. (born 1946), born in Columbia, NASA astronaut, United States Marine Corps major general, administrator of NASA
 Peter Boulware (born 1974), born in Columbia, former linebacker for the Baltimore Ravens
 Zackary Bowman (born 1984), born in Columbia, cornerback for the Chicago Bears
 Jarrell Brantley (born 1996), basketball player
 Rick Brewer, former administrator at Charleston Southern University in North Charleston, and current president of Louisiana College in Pineville, Louisiana
 Lee Brice (born 1980), born in Sumter, country artist, co-wrote the Garth Brooks song More Than a Memory
 Danielle Brooks (born 1989), raised in Simpsonville, actress
 Preston Brooks (born 1819), born in Edgefield, advocate of slavery and states' rights before the American Civil War
 Robert Brooks (born 1970), born in Greenwood, former wide receiver for the Green Bay Packers and the Denver Broncos
 J. Anthony Brown, born in Columbia, actor, comedian and radio personality from Columbia
 Kwame Brown (born 1982), born in Charleston, center for the Golden State Warriors
 Omar Brown (born 1988), born in Moncks Corner, free safety for the Baltimore Ravens
 Sheldon Brown (born 1979), born in Lancaster, cornerback for the Cleveland Browns
 Martavis Bryant (born 1991), born in Calhoun Falls, wide receiver for the Pittsburgh Steelers
 Peabo Bryson (born 1951), born in Greenville, R&B singer-songwriter
 Jared Burton (born 1981), born in Westminster, relief pitcher for the Minnesota Twins
 Rafael Bush (born 1987), born in Williston, safety for the New Orleans Saints

C–D

 Anna Camp (born 1982), born in Aiken, actress, The Help
 Shane Carruth (born 1972), born in Myrtle Beach, filmmaker
 Harry Carson (born 1953), born in Florence, football player, inducted into the Pro Football Hall of Fame 2006
 Wilson Casey (born 1954), born in Woodruff, "Trivia" Guinness World Record holder, nationally syndicated trivia newspaper columnist
 Chandler Catanzaro (born 1991), born in Greenville, placekicker for the Arizona Cardinals
 Charlamagne Tha God (born 1980), born in Moncks Corner, radio and TV personality
 Chubby Checker (born 1941 as Ernest Evans), born in Spring Gulley (Andrews), singer
 Kelsey Chow (born 1991), born and raised in Columbia, actress
 Jim Clyburn (born 1940), born in Sumter, U.S. congressman
 Landon Cohen (born 1986), born in Spartanburg, defensive tackle for the Seattle Seahawks
 Stephen Colbert (born 1964), born in Washington, D.C. but grew up in Charleston, comedian, anchor, political analyst, television personality, former host of The Colbert Report and current host of the television show The Late Show with Stephen Colbert
 Catherine Coleman (born 1960), born in Charleston, chemist, former U.S. Air Force officer, current NASA astronaut
 Monique Coleman (born 1980), born in Orangeburg, actress
 Mike Colter (born 1976), born in Columbia, raised in St. Matthews, actor, Ringer
 Angell Conwell (born 1983), born in Orangeburg and raised in Columbia, actress
 Tyrone Corbin (born 1962), born in Columbia, NBA player and coach
 Torrey Craig (born 1990), born in Columbia, NBA player
 Shawn Crawford (born 1978), born in Van Wyck, gold medalist in 2004 Athens Olympics 200 meters, silver in 2008 Beijing Olympics
 Madelyn Cline (born 1997), in Goose Creek, actress
 Beth Daniel (born 1956), born in Charleston, golfer, member of World Golf Hall of Fame
George B. Daniels (born 1953), federal judge
 Kristin Davis (born 1965), early in her childhood, she and her parents moved to Columbia, actress, known for role as Charlotte York in Sex and the City
 Richard C. Davis (born 1963), from Charleston, real estate broker and television personality
 Viola Davis (born 1965), born in St. Matthews, actress, The Help
 Katon Dawson (born 1956), born in Columbia, former chairman of the South Carolina Republican Party
 Manish Dayal (born 1983), born in Orangeburg, actor, 90210
 Will Demps (born 1963), born in Charleston, football safety played for the Baltimore Ravens and others
 Andy Dick (born 1965), born in Charleston, actor and comedian best known for his roles on TV sitcoms
 Steven Duggar (born 1993), baseball player for the San Francisco Giants
 Charles Duke (born 1935), raised in Lancaster, engineer, retired U.S. Air Force officer, test pilot, former astronaut
 Justin Durant (born 1985), born in Florence, linebacker for the Atlanta Falcons

E–F

 Ainsley Earhardt (born 1976), grew up in Columbia, correspondent for Fox News
 Marian Wright Edelman (born 1939), born in Bennettsville, activist for the rights of children
 Armanti Edwards (born 1988), born in Greenwood, Pro football player for the Carolina Panthers and Cleveland Browns
 Carl Edwards Jr. (born 1991), born in Prosperity, relief pitcher for the Chicago Cubs
 Eddie Edwards (born 1954), born in Sumter, former defensive end for the Cincinnati Bengals football team
 John Edwards (born 1953), born in Seneca, former U.S. Senator from North Carolina (1999–2005), 2004 Democratic nominee for Vice President under John Kerry
 Leslie Jean Egnot (born 1963), born in Greenville, Olympic yachtswoman for New Zealand
 Andre Ellington (born 1989), born in Moncks Corner, running back for the Arizona Cardinals
 Bruce Ellington (born 1991), born in Moncks Corner, wide receiver for the San Francisco 49ers
 Shaun Ellis (born 1977), born in Anderson, defensive end for the New England Patriots football team
 Frank Emanuel (born 1942), born in Clio, former football linebacker for Miami Dolphins and the New Orleans Saints
 Alex English (born 1954), born in Columbia, basketball player, member of the Basketball Hall of Fame
 Joe Arnold Erwin (born 1956), born in Florence, entrepreneur and politician, former chairman of the South Carolina Democratic Party
 Leomont Evans (born 1974), born in Abbeville, former American football safety in the National Football League for the Washington Redskins
 Ralph B. Everett (born 1951), born in Orangeburg, lobbyist and political staffer
 Shepard Fairey (born 1970), born in Charleston, artist who created the Barack Obama "Hope" poster
 Shannon Faulkner (born 1975), born in Powdersville, the first female cadet to enter The Citadel
 Raymond Felton (born 1984), born in Marion, professional basketball player
 Michael Flessas (born 1959), attended college and lived in South Carolina, actor, best known for his role in the film Dancer in the Dark
 Tyler Florence (born 1971), born in Greenville, television chef
 Rickey Foggie (born 1966), born in Laurens, former quarterback in the Canadian Football League and the Arena Football League
 Pearl Fryar (born 1940), topiary artist living in Bishopville
 Steven Furtick (born 1980) born in Moncks Corner, founder and lead pastor of Elevation Church

G–I

 Samkon Gado (born 1982), attended Ben Lippen High School in Columbia, running back in the National Football League
 Brett Gardner (born 1983), born in Holly Hill, left fielder for the New York Yankees
 Kevin Garnett (born 1976), born in Mauldin, retired professional basketball player for the Minnesota Timberwolves, Boston Celtics, and Brooklyn Nets
 Leeza Gibbons (born 1957), born in Hartsville, talk show host of Entertainment Tonight and other Hollywood news shows
 Thomas Gibson (born 1962), born in Charleston, actor, Criminal Minds
 William Gibson (born 1948), born in Conway, author, credited as the father of the Cyberpunk genre of science fiction
 Stephon Gilmore (born 1990), born in Rock Hill, cornerback for the New England Patriots
 Candice Glover (born 1989), born in Beaufort, American Idol (season 12) winner
 Joseph L. Goldstein (born 1940), born in Kingstree, Nobel Prize-winning biochemist and geneticist
 André Goodman (born 1978), born in Greenville, cornerback for the Denver Broncos
 A. J. Green (born 1988), born in Summerville, wide receiver for the Cincinnati Bengals
 Zack Godley (born 1990), born in Bamberg, starting pitcher for the Arizona Diamondbacks
 Malliciah Goodman (born 1990), born in Florence, defensive end for the Atlanta Falcons
 B. J. Goodson (born 1993), born in Lamar, linebacker for the New York Giants
 Jonathan Goodwin (born 1978), born in Columbia, offensive lineman in the National Football League
 K. Lee Graham (born 1997), from Chapin, won the Miss Teen USA 2014 pageant
 Lindsey Graham (born 1955), from Central, politician, lawyer, long-time South Carolina Senator since 2003, and unsuccessful 2016 presidential candidate
 Boyce Green (born 1960), born in Beaufort, former running back in the National Football League
 Chad Green (born 1991), born in Greenville, relief pitcher for the New York Yankees
 Alvin Greene (born 1977), born in Florence, 2010 Democratic nominee for United States Senator
 Fred Griffith (born 1964), born in Spartanburg, actor and producer
 Michael Hackett (born 1960), basketball player, Liga Profesional de Baloncesto MVP in 1984, and Israeli League Top Scorer in 1991
 Nikki Haley (born 1972), born and raised in Bamberg, Indian-American politician, former Governor of South Carolina (2010–2017), and United States Ambassador to the United Nations since 2017
 Trevor Hall (born 1986), from Hilton Head, musician
 Jakar Hamilton (born 1989), from Johnston, safety for the Dallas Cowboys
 Michael Hamlin (born 1985), from Lamar, safety for the Jacksonville Jaguars
 Jason Hammel (born 1982), from Greenville, starting pitcher for the Kansas City Royals
 Shanola Hampton (born 1977), from Charleston, actress, on Showtime series Shameless
 Ken "The Hawk" Harrelson (born 1941), born in Woodruff, television broadcast announcer for the Chicago White Sox
 Albert Haynesworth (born 1981), from Hartsville, defensive tackle for the Tennessee Titans
 Matt Hazel (born 1992), from North Augusta, wide receiver for the Miami Dolphins
 Josh Head, from Rock Hill, rhythm guitarist for the band Emery
 Heath Hembree (born 1989), from Cowpens, relief pitcher for the Boston Red Sox
 Jordan Hill (born 1987), from Newberry, National Basketball Association player
 Lauren Michelle Hill (born 1979), from Columbia, model, actress, Playboy Playmate
 Vonnie Holliday (born 1975), from Camden, defensive lineman for the Washington Redskins
 Chris Hope (born 1980), from Rock Hill, safety for the Atlanta Falcons
 Bo Hopkins (born 1942), from Greenville, actor
 DeAndre Hopkins (born 1992), from Central, South Carolina, NFL wide receiver
 Todd Howard (born 1965), from Spartanburg, entrepreneur and public figure
 Orlando Hudson (born 1977), from Darlington, Gold Glove-winning Major League Baseball player
 Josephine Humphreys (born 1945), from Charleston, author
 Fiona Hutchison (born 1960), raised in Columbia and attended Clemson University, soap opera actress
 Lauren Hutton (born 1943), from Charleston, supermodel, actress
 Dontrelle Inman (born 1989), from Charleston, NFL and Canadian Football League wide receiver
 Madison Iseman (born 1997), from Myrtle Beach, actress

J–L

 Jesse Jackson (born 1941), born in Greenville, politician and civil rights activist
 Young Jeezy (born 1977 as Jay Wayne Jenkins), born in Columbia, rap and hip-hop performer
 Sylvia Jefferies (born 1969), born in Greenwood, actress, Nashville
 Alshon Jeffery (born 1990), born in St. Matthews, wide receiver for the Philadelphia Eagles
 Willie Jeffries (born 1937), born in Union, former player and head football coach of South Carolina State University, first African American head coach of an NCAA Division I-A football program at a predominantly White college, member of the College Football Hall of Fame
 Jarvis Jenkins (born 1988), born in Clemson, defensive end for the Washington Redskins
 Tim Jennings (born 1983), born in Orangeburg, cornerback for the Chicago Bears
 Jasper Johns (born 1933), grew up in Allendale, painter and printmaker
 Anthony Johnson (born 1974), born in Charleston, professional basketball player
 Dustin Johnson (born 1984), born in Columbia, professional golfer 
 T. J. Johnson (born 1990), born in Aynor, former NFL center for the Cincinnati Bengals
 Christopher Jones (born 1982), born in Myrtle Beach, actor and dancer
 Greg Jones (born 1981), born in Beaufort, fullback for the Jacksonville Jaguars
 Orlando Jones (born 1968), attended high school in Mauldin, comedian and actor
 Alexis Jordan (born 1992), born in Columbia, R&B and pop singer
 Spencer Kieboom (born 1991), born in Mount Pleasant, catcher for the Washington Nationals
 Terry Kinard (born 1959), from Sumter, former safety for the New York Giants and Houston Oilers
 Betsy King (born 1955), from Spartanburg, golfer, member of World Golf Hall of Fame
 Michael Kohn (born 1986), from Camden, relief pitcher for the Los Angeles Angels of Anaheim
 Carlos Knight (born 1993), from Columbia, television actor
 Sterling Knight (born 1989), from Hilton Head Island, actor, singer-songwriter, musician
 Matt William Knowles (born 1985), from Greenville, actor.
 Sallie Krawcheck (born 1964), from Charleston, former Chairman and Chief Executive Officer of Citi Global Wealth Management
 Lance Laury (born 1982), from Hopkins, football player, linebacker for the New York Jets
 DeMarcus Lawrence (born 1992), from Aiken, defensive end for the Dallas Cowboys
 Andy Lee (born 1982), from Westminster, football player, punter for the San Francisco 49ers
 Jordan Lyles (born 1990), from Hartsville, baseball player, starting pitcher for the Colorado Rockies

M–O

 Andie MacDowell (born 1958), born in Gaffney, model and actress
 Logan Marshall-Green (born 1976), born in Charleston, actor, Dark Blue 
 George Martin (born 1953), from Greenville, former defensive end for the New York Giants
 Cliff Matthews (born 1989), born in Cheraw, defensive end for the Atlanta Falcons
 Byron Maxwell (born 1988), born in North Charleston, cornerback for the Philadelphia Eagles
 Anthuan Maybank (born 1969), born in Georgetown, Olympic gold medalist 4x400
 Edwin McCain (born 1970), born in Greenville, musician and songwriter
 Johnathan McClain (born 1970), born in Myrtle Beach, actor and writer
 Tony McDaniel (born 1985), born in Hartsville, defensive tackle for the Seattle Seahawks
 Rocky McIntosh (born 1982), grew up in Gaffney, linebacker for the Washington Redskins
 Marian McKnight (born 1936), born in Manning, Miss America 1957, actress, producer and writer
 Tre McLean (born 1993), basketball player in the Israeli Basketball Premier League
 Henry McMaster (born 1947), born in Columbia, Governor of South Carolina since 2017
 Walter Russell Mead (born 1952), born in Columbia, journalist, editor-at-large of The American Interest magazine
 Dave Meggett (born 1966), born in Charleston, former NFL running back, primarily with the New York Giants
 Jamon Meredith (born 1986), born in Simpsonville, professional football player, offensive tackle for the New York Giants
 Patina Miller (born 1984), born in Pageland, actress, singer, Madam Secretary, All My Children, The Hunger Games: Mockingjay films
 Adam Minarovich (born 1977), from Anderson, actor
 Vanessa Minnillo (born 1980), from Charleston, television personality on Entertainment Tonight
 Jordan Montgomery (born 1992), from Sumter, starting pitcher for the New York Yankees
 Tim Montgomery (born 1975), from Gaffney, Olympic athlete, and ESPY AWARD winner
 Darla Moore (born 1954), born in Lake City, financial executive
 D. J. Moore (born 1987), born in Spartanburg, professional football player, cornerback for the Chicago Bears
 Ja Morant (born 1999), born in Dalzell, No.2 pick in NBA Draft, NBA player for the Memphis Grizzlies
 Julianne Morris (born 1968), born in Columbia, actress, Days of Our Lives
 Maurice Morris (born 1979), born in Chester, professional football player, running back for the Detroit Lions
 R. Winston Morris (born 1941), from Barnwell, tuba player and composer, professor at Tennessee Technological University
 Mick Mulvaney (born 1967), grew up in Indian Land, director of the Office of Management and Budget
 Allison Munn (born 1974), grew up in Columbia, actress
 Kris Neely (born 1978), born in Spartanburg, artist who has created more than 10,000 Guardian angel paintings
Clifton Newman - Judge presided over several high profile criminal cases
 Josh Norman (born 1987), from Greenwood, cornerback for the Washington Redskins
 Nancy O'Dell (born 1966), born in Sumter, TV personality, Access Hollywood and Entertainment Tonight
 Jermaine O'Neal (born 1978), born in Columbia, basketball player for the Boston Celtics
 Chris Owings (born 1991), born in Charleston, Major League Baseball player

P–S

 Emilio Pagán, closer for the Tampa Bay Rays, from Simpsonville
 Lu Parker, broadcast journalist and Miss USA 1994, from Anderson
 Mary-Louise Parker, film and television actress, born in Fort Jackson
 Ron Parker (born 1987), born in Saint Helena Island, safety for the Kansas City Chiefs
 Teyonah Parris (born 1987), born in Hopkins, actress, Mad Men, WandaVision
 Will Patton (born 1954), actor, born in Charleston
 Carl Anthony Payne II (born 1969), actor, Martin, Rock Me Baby, The Cosby Show
 Teddy Pendergrass (born 1950), born in Kingstree, singer
 William "The Refrigerator" Perry, former professional football player, born in Aiken
 Bobbie Phillips (born 1972), actress, The Cape, Murder One
 Virginia Postrel (born 1960), political and cultural writer, born in Greenville
 Josh Powell, power forward and center for the Atlanta Hawks, born in Charleston
 Jeryl Prescott (born 1964), from Hartsville, actress
 Brian Quick (born 1989), born in Columbia, wide receiver for the St. Louis Rams 
 Robert Quinn (born 1990), from Ladson, defensive end for the Dallas Cowboys
 Willie Randolph (born 1954), born in Holly Hill, MLB player, manager, third base coach for the Baltimore Orioles
 Arthur Ravenel Jr. (born 1927), born in Charleston, Republican politician
 Arizona Reid (born 1986), Israeli National League basketball player
 Hunter Renfrow (born 1995), born in Myrtle Beach, NFL wide receiver
 Sidney Rice (born 1986), born in Gaffney, wide receiver for the Seattle Seahawks
 Bobby Richardson (born 1935), born in Sumter, baseball player for the New York Yankees
 Richard Wilson Riley (born 1933), governor of South Carolina, U.S. Secretary of Education 1993–2001
 Leon Rippy (born 1949), born in Rock Hill, film and television actor
 Jane Robelot (born 1960), in Greenville, Co Anchor CBS This Morning 
 Andre Roberts (born 1988), born in Columbia, football player for the Arizona Cardinals
 Julie Roberts (born 1979), from Lancaster, country music singer
 Eugene Robinson (born 1955), born in Orangeburg, Pulitzer Prize-winning newspaper columnist
 Chris Rock (born 1965), born in Andrews, comedian, actor, screenwriter, film, TV producer, and director
 Joshua Rogers (born 1994), born in Greeleyville, recording artist, Season 5 winner of BET's Sunday Best
 Mackenzie Rosman (born 1989), born in Charleston, actress, 7th Heaven
 Darius Rucker (born 1966), born in Charleston, musician, lead singer of Hootie & The Blowfish, now a solo artist
 Reggie Sanders (born 1967), born in Florence, professional baseball player
 O'Brien Schofield (born 1987), born in Camden, outside linebacker for the Atlanta Falcons
 Ian Scott (born 1981), born in Greenville, football player, defensive tackle for the San Diego Chargers
 Ramon Sessions (born 1986), born in Myrtle Beach, basketball player for the NBA
 Richard Seymour (born 1979), born in Gadsden, football player, defensive lineman for the Oakland Raiders
 Art Shell (born 1946), born in Charleston, Pro Football Hall of Fame offensive tackle and head coach for the Oakland/Los Angeles Raiders
 Donnie Shell (born 1952), born in Whitmire, Pro Football Hall of Fame strong safety for the Pittsburgh Steelers, member of the Steelers famed Steel Curtain defense in the 1970s
 John Shumate (born 1952), born in Greenville, professional basketball player
 Shawnee Smith (born 1970), born in Orangeburg, film and television actress, musician
 J. Smith-Cameron (born 1955), raised in Greenville, stage and screen actress
 Justin Smoak (born 1986), born in Goose Creek, baseball player for the Toronto Blue Jays
 Jay Stamper (born 1972), Democratic candidate for U.S. Senate, resident of Columbia
 Zak Stevens (born 1966), born in Columbia, lead singer in the heavy metal band Savatage, backup singer for Trans-Siberian Orchestra and lead singer for Circle II Circle
 Melvin Stewart (born 1968), raised in Fort Mill, Olympic swimmer, SwimSwam co-founder
 Jessica Stroup (born 1986), born in Anderson, actress, 90210, The Following, Ted

T–Z

 Devin Taylor (born 1989), from Lady's Island, defensive end for the Detroit Lions
 Tyler Thigpen (born 1984), from Winnsboro, quarterback for the Buffalo Bills
 Brandon Thomas (born 1991), from Spartanburg, offensive guard for the San Francisco 49ers
 Gorman Thomas (born 1950), from Charleston, former outfielder for the Milwaukee Brewers, Cleveland Indians, and Seattle Mariners
 Stephen Thompson (born 1983), kickboxer and UFC fighter
 David Thornton (born 1953), from Cheraw, television actor
 Kelly Tilghman (born 1969), from North Myrtle Beach, broadcaster for The Golf Channel, and the PGA Tour's first female lead golf announcer
 Lawrence Timmons (born 1986), from Florence, linebacker for the Pittsburgh Steelers
Gina Tolleson (born 1970), from Spartanburg American model and beauty queen crowned Miss World America 1990
 Steven Tolleson (born 1983), from Spartanburg, infielder for the Baltimore Orioles
 Josh Turner (born 1977), from Hannah, country music singer
 Corey Washington (born 1991), from North Charleston, wide receiver for the New York Giants
 Benjamin Watson (born 1980), from Rock Hill, tight end for the New Orleans Saints
 Shawn Weatherly (born 1959), from Sumter, Miss USA and Miss Universe 1980
 Sean Weatherspoon (born 1987), from Greenville, linebacker for the Arizona Cardinals
 Celia Weston (born 1951), from Spartanburg, character actress
 Chris White (born 1983), from Chester, guard and center for the Seattle Seahawks
 Roddy White (born 1981), from James Island, football player, wide receiver for the Atlanta Falcons
 Tracy White (born 1981), from Charleston, linebacker for the New England Patriots
 Vanna White (born 1957), from North Myrtle Beach, co-host on Wheel of Fortune
 Johnny Whitworth (born 1975), from Charleston, actor, CSI: Miami, The 100, Limitless
 Matt Wieters (born 1986), from Goose Creek, catcher for the St. Louis Cardinals
 Armstrong Williams (born 1959), from Marion, television and radio host, columnist, political activist
 Dennis Williams (born 1965), basketball player
 A'ja Wilson (born 1996), born in Hopkins, basketball player for the Las Vegas Aces, 2020 WNBA MVP
 Zion Williamson (born 2000), raised in Spartanburg, No.1 pick in NBA Draft, NBA player for New Orleans Pelicans
 Mookie Wilson (born 1956), from Bamberg, former center fielder for the New York Mets and Toronto Blue Jays
 Rod Wilson (born 1981), from Cross, linebacker for the Chicago Bears
 DeWayne Wise (born 1978), from Columbia, outfielder for the Chicago White Sox
 Chad Wolf (born 1976), from Charleston, lead vocalist in band "Carolina Liar" 
 Bill Workman (1940–2019), born in Charleston, mayor of Greenville 1983–1995, retired economic development specialist; resident of Walterboro 
 Isaac Wright Jr. (born 1962), lawyer; born in Moncks Corner
 Mike Wright (born 1990), from Bennettsville, pitcher for the Baltimore Orioles
 Samuel E. Wright (1946–2021), from Camden, actor and Broadway performer
 Cale Yarborough (born 1939), from Timmonsville, 3x NASCAR Cup Series champion

Deceased

A–D

 Norman C. Armitage (1907–1972), Olympic medalist saber fencer
 Annie Maria Barnes (1857 – unknown), born in Columbia, journalist, editor, and author
 Frances Elizabeth Barrow (1822-1894), born in Charleston, children's writer
Bernard Baruch (1870–1965), born in Camden, financier, philanthropist, statesman, and adviser to President Woodrow Wilson and Franklin Roosevelt 
 Paul Benjamin (1938–2019), born in Pelion, actor
 Alfred W. Bethea (1916–1999), former member of the South Carolina House of Representatives from Dillon; the 1970 gubernatorial nominee of the American Independent Party 
 Mary McLeod Bethune (1875–1955), born and raised in Mayesville in Sumter County, civil rights leader and groundbreaking educator
 Doc Blanchard (1924–2009), born in McColl, raised in Bishopville, college football player who became the first ever junior to win the Heisman Trophy
 James F. Byrnes (1882–1972), born in Charleston, U.S. Representative, U.S. Senator, Justice of the Supreme Court, Secretary of State, and 104th governor of South Carolina.
 James Butler Bonham (1807–1836), from Red Bank (now Saluda), lawyer, soldier, and defender of the Alamo
 Chadwick Boseman (1976–2020), born in Anderson, actor, known for his role as Black Panther in Captain America: Civil War and in the 2018 film of the same name
 James Brown (1933–2006), born in Barnwell, singer, songwriter, musician, and recording artist dubbed the "godfather of soul"
 Pat Caddell (1950–2019), born in Rock Hill, public opinion pollster, political film consultant
 Tommy Caldwell (1949–1980), from Spartanburg, bassist for the Marshall Tucker Band
 Toy Caldwell (1947–1993), from Spartanburg, lead guitarist and vocalist for the Marshall Tucker Band
 Floride Calhoun (1792–1866), born in Charleston, Second Lady of the United States
 John Caldwell Calhoun (1782–1850), born in Abbeville County, U.S. Senator, Secretary of State, Secretary of War, and the 7th Vice-President of the U.S.
 Carroll A. Campbell Jr. (1940–2005), born in Greenville, South Carolina Governor and U.S. Congressman
 John Tucker Campbell (1912–1991), born in Calhoun Falls, Secretary of State 1978–1991, Mayor of Columbia 1970–1978, city councilman, drugstore owner
 Marion Campbell (1929–2016), born in Chester, NFL defensive lineman and head coach
 Essie B. Cheesborough (1826-1905), born in Charleston, writer 
 Alice Childress (1920–1994), born in Charleston, playwright who wrote about the struggles of poverty and racism
 Dave Cockrum (1943–2006), died in Belton, comic book artist
 O'Neal Compton (1951–2019), born in Sumter, character actor
 Pat Conroy (1945–2016), grew up in Beaufort, attended Beaufort High School and The Citadel, novelist
 James S. Cothran (1830–1897), born in Abbeville County, U.S. House of Representatives for South Carolina's 3rd congressional district
 Charles Craven (1682–1754), governor of colonial South Carolina during the Tuscarora War and Yamasee War
 Robert Houston Curry (1842–1892), member of the Louisiana House of Representatives from Bossier Parish; wounded Confederate Army veteran at Second Battle of Manassas, born near Winnsboro, South Carolina
 Esther Dale (1885–1961), born in Beaufort, actress
 Gary Davis (1896–1972), born in Clinton, blues and gospel songwriter and innovative guitarist
 Mary Elizabeth Moragne Davis (1815–1903), Oakwood, Abbeville District, diarist and author 
 Mendel Jackson Davis (1942–2007), born in North Charleston, United States Representative from South Carolina
 Robert C. De Large (1842–1874), born in Aiken, member of United States House of Representatives from South Carolina
 James Dickey (1923–1997), professor at University of South Carolina at Columbia, poet and novelist
 Samuel Henry Dickson (1798–1872), born in Charleston, poet, physician, writer and educator
 Anna Peyre Dinnies (1805-1886), born in Georgetown, poet and writer
 Julius Dixson (1913–2004), born in Barnwell, songwriter and record company executive
 Larry Doby (1923–2003), born in Camden, baseball player in Negro leagues and Major League Baseball, first black player in American League, later manager of Chicago White Sox, Hall of Fame inductee
 Stanley Donen (1924–2019), born in Columbia, film director and choreographer
 Ulysses Dove (1947–1996), born in Columbia, choreographer
 David Drake (c.1800–c.1870s), from Edgefield, potter
 Watson B. Duncan III (1915–1991), born in Charleston, college professor
 William Wallace Duncan (1839–1908), died in Spartanburg, bishop of the Methodist Episcopal Church, South

E–G

 John B. Earle (1766–1836), died in Anderson County, U.S. Representative from South Carolina
 Samuel Earle (1760–1833), died in Pendleton District, United States Representative from South Carolina
 Frederick J. Eikerenkoetter II, Reverend Ike (1935–2009), born in Ridgeland, minister and electronic evangelist
 Edward C. Elmore (1826– aft. 1864), born in Columbia, Treasurer of the Confederate States of America
 Lilian Ellison (1923–2007), born in Kershaw County, female professional wrestler better known as the Fabulous Moolah
 Esquerita (1935–1986), born in Greenville, singer, songwriter and pianist, original name Eskew Reeder Jr.
 Richard Evonitz (1963–2002), born in Columbia, serial killer
 James Farrow (1827–1892), born in Laurens, politician in Confederate Congress, elected to U.S. House of Representatives
 William G. Farrow (1918–1942), born in Darlington, captured and executed by the Japanese military following the Doolittle Raid
 Charles Fernley Fawcett (1915–2008), grew up in Greenville, co-founder of the International Medical Corps
 Eugene Figg (1936–2002), born in Charleston, structural engineer who made numerous contributions to the field of structural engineering
 David E. Finley Jr. (1890–1977), born in York, art executive, first director of the National Gallery of Art, founding chairman of the National Trust for Historic Preservation, and chairman of the United States Commission of Fine Arts
 Kirkman George Finlay (1877–1938), born in Greenville, first bishop of the Episcopal Diocese of Upper South Carolina
 James Dudley Fooshe (1844–1940), born in Abbeville District (now Greenwood County), soldier, author, farmer, philosopher, and Methodist churchman
 Joe Frazier (1944–2011), born in Beaufort, boxer, 1964 Olympic heavyweight champion and the world heavyweight champ 1970–73
 Nancy Friday (1933–2017), grew up in Charleston, author, specializing in topics of female sexuality and liberation
 David du Bose Gaillard (1859–1913), born in Manning, U.S. Army engineer instrumental in the construction of the Panama Canal
 John Gaillard (1765–1826), born in St. Stephen's district, U.S. Senator
 Althea Gibson (1927–2003), born in Silver, Clarendon County, first African-American player to win Wimbledon and U.S. National tennis championships
 Dizzy Gillespie (1917–1993), born in Cheraw, African-American jazz trumpeter, bandleader, singer and composer
 Gordon Glisson (1930–1997), born in Winnsboro, thoroughbred horse racing jockey
 Maxcy Gregg (1814–1862), born in Columbia, lawyer, and brigadier general in the Confederate States Army
 James Grimsley Jr. (1921–2013), born in Florence, major general U.S. Army and president of The Citadel

H–L

 Johnson Hagood (1828–1898), Confederate general and governor of South Carolina
 James Henry Hammond (1807–1864), US congressman, senator and governor of South Carolina;
 Wade Hampton I (1752–1835), U.S. Congressman from South Carolina, born in Virginia
 Wade Hampton II (1791–1858), born in Columbia, plantation owner and soldier
 Wade Hampton III (1818–1902), born in Charleston, Confederate general, governor, United States Senator
 DuBose Heyward (1885–1940), born in Charleston, playwright and poet, wrote the novel "Porgy" and its stage incarnations "Porgy" and "Porgy and Bess"
 Thomas Heyward Jr. (1746–1809), signer of the Declaration of Independence
 Thomas Hitchcock Jr. (1900–1944), polo player
 Corinne Stocker Horton (1871-1947), born in Orangeburg, elocutionist, journalist, newspaper editor,
 George Izard (1776–1828), an American general in War of 1812, and 2nd Governor of Arkansas Territory
 Andrew Jackson (1765–1845), 7th President of the United States
 'Shoeless' Joe Jackson (1887–1951), former outfielder for Chicago White Sox
 John G. Jackson (1907–1993), Pan-Africanist historian, lecturer, teacher and writer
 James Jamerson (1938–1983), bass player
 Anthony James (1942–2020), actor, Unforgiven
 Caroline Howard Jervey (1823-1877), born in Charleston, author and poet
 William H Johnson (1901–1970), artist
 Robert Jordan (1948–2007), fantasy author
 Joseph B. Kershaw (1822–1894), slave owner and Confederate general who served as a Division Commander, Army of Northern Virginia, State Senator, Circuit Court Judge
 Lane Kirkland (1922–1999), labor union leader and president of the AFL–CIO, 1979–1995
 Richard Rowland Kirkland (1843–1863), Confederate soldier
 Eartha Kitt (1927–2008), actress, singer, and cabaret star
 Noah O. Knight (1929–1951), soldier in the United States Army during the Korean War, posthumously received the Medal of Honor
 John Laurens (1754–1782), soldier and statesman from South Carolina during the American Revolutionary War
 Mary Elizabeth Lee (1813-1849), born in Charleston, writer
 Hyman Isaac Long (born 18th century), born in Jamaica, Freemason
 Terry Long (1959–2005), guard for the Pittsburgh Steelers
 James "Pete" Longstreet (1821–1904), Confederate general, commander of the 1st Corps of the Army of Northern Virginia
 Harry B. Luthi (1933–2019), from Greenville, former mayor and retired businessman
 Thomas Lynch Jr. (1749–1779), signer of the Declaration of Independence

M–R

 Barton MacLane (1902–1969), born in Columbia, actor, playwright, and screenwriter
 James Robert Mann (1920–2010), born in Greenville, soldier, lawyer and a United States Representative
 Francis Marion (c. 1732–1795), born in Winyah (Winyah Bay), a.k.a. the Swamp Fox, strategic fighter against the British during the War of Independence
 Annie Virginia McCracken (1868–?), born in Charleston; published a magazine while living in Summerville
 Ronald McNair (1950–1986), born in Lake City, astronaut killed in the explosion of the Space Shuttle Challenger
 Arthur Middleton (1742–1787), born in Charleston, signer of the Declaration of Independence, Governor (1810–1812), Representative (1815–1819), and Minister to Russia (1820–1830)
 William Ephraim Mikell (1868–1944), born in Sumter, Dean of the University of Pennsylvania Law School
 Robert Mills (1781–1855), born in Charleston, architect, designed the Washington Monument and many public buildings
 Kary Mullis (1944–2019), grew up in Columbia, biochemist and Nobel laureate
 Billy O'Dell (1933–2018), born in Whitmire, Major League Baseball pitcher
 Peggy Parish (1927–1988), born in Manning, author of Amelia Bedelia series
 Julia Peterkin (1880–1961), born in Laurens County, Pulitzer Prize winner
 Bill Pinkney (1925–2007), born in Dalzell, pitcher in the Negro leagues, served in World War II, performer and singer with The Drifters
 Joel Roberts Poinsett (1779–1851), born in Charleston, Martin Van Buren's Secretary of War, physician, botanist, and statesman, as well as famous eponym
 Melvin Purvis (1903–1960), born in Timmonsville, FBI agent responsible for ending the criminal careers of Baby Face Nelson, Pretty Boy Floyd, and John Dillinger
 Thomas C. Reynolds (1821–1887), born in Charleston, Confederate governor of Missouri from 1862 to 1865
 Flint Rhem (1901–1969), Major League Baseball pitcher
 Don Rhymer (1961–2012), born in Union, film writer and producer
 Bobby Robinson (1917–2011), born in Union, record producer
 Thomas A. Roe (1927–2000), born in Greenville, businessman and conservative philanthropist
 Arthur Rose Sr. (1921–1995), born in Charleston, Chair of the Art Department at Claflin University, Orangeburg (1952–1973)
 Al Rosen (1924–2015), born in Spartanburg, 4x All Star and MVP baseball player
 Thomas Jefferson Rusk (1803–1857), born in Pendleton; early political and military leader of the Republic of Texas
 Edward Rutledge (1749–1800), youngest signer of the Declaration of Independence; later governor of South Carolina
 Francis H. Rutledge (1799–1866), born in Charleston, first Episcopal bishop of Florida
 John Rutledge (1739–1800), statesman and judge, elected President of South Carolina, April 1776, under the constitution drawn up on March 26, 1776

S–Z

 Gloria Saunders (1927–1980), actress, born in Columbia
 Jake Scott (1945–2020), born in Greenwood, former safety for the Miami Dolphins and Washington Redskins
 Mike Sharperson (1961–1996), baseball player, member of 1988 World Series champion Los Angeles Dodgers, born in Orangeburg
 Robert Smalls (1839–1915), born in Beaufort, naval pilot during American Civil War, founder of South Carolina Republican Party
 Arthur Smith (1921–2014), born in Clinton, guitarist, songwriter, radio-TV personality, composer of "Guitar Boogie" and "Dueling Banjos"
 Louise Hammond Willis Snead (1870–1958), born in Charleston, artist, writer, lecturer, and composer
 Mickey Spillane (1918–2006), lived in Murrells Inlet, crime novel author, many featuring fictional detective Mike Hammer
 John Steadman (1909–1993), born in Lexington, radio personality and actor; played "Pop" in The Longest Yard
 William Barret Travis (1809–1836), born in Saluda County, 19th-century American lawyer and soldier; commander of Texan forces at the Alamo
 Melanie Thornton (1967–2001), born in Charleston, Eurodance singer for La Bouche, famous for the singles "Be My Lover" and "Sweet Dreams"
 Strom Thurmond (1902–2003), born in Edgefield, South Carolina Governor, and the oldest and 2nd longest-serving U.S. Senator
 Charles Townes (1915–2015), from Greenville, Nobel Prize-winning physicist and educator
 Tom Turnipseed (1936–2020), lived in Columbia, lawyer, executive director of the 1968 presidential campaign of George C. Wallace, former member of the South Carolina State Senate
 Angelica Singleton Van Buren (1818–1877), born in Wedgefield, married Abraham Van Buren while his father, Martin Van Buren, was the eighth President of the United States; served as First Lady of the United States for the rest of his term in the White House
 William Washington Vance (1849–1900), born in Cokesbury, trained in the law in Abbeville, South Carolina; state senator from Bossier Parish, Louisiana, and private secretary to Governor Murphy J. Foster in Baton Rouge
 Denmark Vesey (c.1767–1822), lived in Charleston, African-American leader
 John B. Watson (1878–1958), grew up in Travelers Rest, psychologist who established the psychological school of behaviorism
 Charles S. West (1829–1885), born in Camden, Texas jurist and politician
 John C. West (1922–2004), politician
 William C. Westmoreland (1914–2005), born in Saxon, deputy commander of Military Assistance Command, Vietnam (MACV) 1964–1968, Army Chief of Staff 1968–1972
 Lily C. Whitaker (c. 1850 – 1932), born in Charleston, educator and author
 Mary Scrimzeour Whitaker (1820-1906), born in Beaufort, litterateur, writer, poet, and novelist
 Johnson Chesnut Whittaker (1858–1931), one of the first black men to win an appointment to the United States Military Academy at West Point
 Louis Wigfall (1816–1874), born in Edgefield, Texas politician who served as a member of the Texas Legislature, United States Senate, and Confederate Senate
 James E. Williams (1930–1999), born in Fort Mill, raised in Darlington, Medal of Honor (Vietnam, 1966), highest decorated enlisted man in the history of the U. S. Navy, U. S. Marshal
 Rosa Louise Woodberry (1869–1932), journalist, educator; born in Barnwell County, South Carolina; lived in,  Williston, South Carolina
 Woodrow Wilson (1856–1924), 28th President of the United States; lived in Columbia in his teenage years
 Henry Woodward (1646–1690), an early colonist of South Carolina who was instrumental in establishing contact with Native Americans and setting up a trading system
 W. D. Workman Jr. (1914–1990), newspaper and radio journalist, author;Republican nominee for the U.S. Senate in 1962 and for governor of South Carolina in 1982
 Lee Thompson Young (1984–2013), born in Columbia, actor, The Famous Jett Jackson, Rizzoli & Isles

See also
By educational institution affiliation

 List of Bob Jones University people
 List of alumni of Clemson University
 List of College of Charleston people
 List of University of South Carolina people

By governmental position

 List of governors of South Carolina
 List of justices of the South Carolina Supreme Court
 List of lieutenant governors of South Carolina
 List of United States representatives from South Carolina
 List of United States senators from South Carolina

By location

 List of people from Charleston, South Carolina
 List of people from Columbia, South Carolina

References

Lists of people from South Carolina